The Church of St. Angela Merici is a Roman Catholic parish church under the authority of the Roman Catholic Archdiocese of New York, located at 917 Morris Avenue, Bronx, New York City. It was established in 1899. It has been staffed by the Apostles of Jesus since 2000.

References 

Religious organizations established in 1899
Roman Catholic churches in the Bronx